The 1921 Centenary Gentlemen football team was an American football team that represented the Centenary College of Louisiana as a member of the Louisiana Intercollegiate Athletic Association during the 1921 college football season. In their third year under head coach Homer Norton, the team compiled a 3–3 record.

Schedule

References

Centenary
Centenary Gentlemen football seasons
Centenary Gentlemen football